Buck v. Davis, 580 U.S. ___ (2017), was a case in which the United States Supreme Court reversed the death sentence of the defendant Duane Buck after the defendant's attorney introduced evidence that suggested the defendant would be more likely to commit violent acts in the future because he was black.

Opinion of the Court
In a 6-2 opinion written by Chief Justice John Roberts, the Court held that the defendant was denied effective assistance of counsel under Strickland v. Washington. Chief Justice Roberts' ruling rejected the District Court's argument that the discussion of race at trial was de minimis and therefore not prejudicial. Rather, Chief Justice Roberts wrote: "when a jury hears expert testimony that expressly makes a defendant’s race directly pertinent on the question of life or death, the impact of that evidence cannot be measured simply by how much air time it received at trial or how many pages it occupies in the record. Some toxins can be deadly in small doses."

See also
 List of United States Supreme Court cases
 Lists of United States Supreme Court cases by volume
 List of United States Supreme Court cases by the Roberts Court

References

External links
 
 Case page at SCOTUSblog

United States Supreme Court cases
United States Supreme Court cases of the Roberts Court
2017 in United States case law